Dominic John Olejniczak (August 18, 1908 – April 16, 1989) was a real estate broker, politician, and American football executive. Olejniczak served as an alderman of Green Bay, Wisconsin, from 1936 to 1944. He was then elected mayor, serving for 10 years from 1945 to 1955. During his tenure as mayor, a number of large infrastructure projects were completed and city administration was streamlined. Olejniczak was also known for his work with the Green Bay Packers. Over a period of almost 50 years, Olejniczak served as a member of the board of directors, a vice president, president, and chairman of the board. , his 24 years as president is the longest tenure of any Packers president. During his presidency, he hired Vince Lombardi in 1959, the Packers would win five championships, and the team saw its net worth grow over 5,000%. In recognition of his contributions, Olejniczak was inducted into the Green Bay Packers Hall of Fame in 1979. He died on April 15, 1989, after a series of strokes.

Early years
Dominic Olejniczak was born in Green Bay, Wisconsin, to John and Victoria Olejniczak on August 18, 1908. He attended Green Bay East High School and lived close to City Stadium, the home of the Green Bay Packers at the time.

City government
Professionally, Olejniczak worked as a real estate broker, but he was also an elected official. He served as alderman from 1936 to 1944 and then as the mayor of Green Bay from 1945 to 1955. In his first election he ran on a platform that included streamlining city administration, infrastructure improvements, and expanding year-round recreation programs. His 10 years in office was, at the time, the longest tenure of any Green Bay mayor in city history. Olejnicnak won his first mayoral election in 1945 by only 83 votes. The small margin necessitated a recount, and although some irregularities were noted, Olejnicnak was certified the winner with 50.7% of the vote. After the 1949 election, Olejnicnak ran unopposed until his retirement in 1955. In an article noting his retirement, the Green Bay Press-Gazette recounted numerous accomplishments during Olejnicnak's tenure as mayor: improving city administration, infrastructure enhancements, and keeping tax rates low. During his tenure, the city of Green Bay built a pipeline to Lake Michigan for its water supply and the beltline around the city was planned and developed. In recognition of Olejniczak's accomplishments, a sold-out dinner with over 500 patrons was thrown in his honor.

Green Bay Packers
Olejniczak was a lifelong fan of the Packers. His childhood home was located close to City Stadium, which at the time was located at his high school's grounds. At that time, a child could carry a player's helmet into the stadium before practices or games, something Olejniczak did a number of times. His support continued as his career progressed, first as alderman and then as mayor of Green Bay.

On July 10, 1950, Olejniczak was first elected to the board of directors of Green Bay Packers, Inc., the publicly-owned, non-profit organization that owns the Packers. As mayor and director, he helped organize a stock drive that generated $100,000 in revenue and helped prevent the team from folding. Olejniczak quickly promoted within the leadership of the Packers: in 1952, he was elected to the executive committee of the board of directors; in 1954 he was named one of two vice presidents; and in 1957, he was named executive vice president. After the resignation and then death of Russ Bogda, Olejniczak was elected as the seventh president of the franchise. When he took over the Packer presidency, the team had not had a winning record in 10 years, and that first season in 1958 under first-year head coach Ray McLean was the worst regular season record (1–10–1) in franchise history.

Olejniczak was a strong advocate for building the New City Stadium in 1957 (renamed "Lambeau Field" in 1965 after the death of Curly Lambeau) and led the search committee that hired New York Giants assistant Vince Lombardi in early 1959. Lombardi would go on to lead the Packers to one of the most successful periods in team history, with five championships and two Super Bowl victories in the 1960s. Re-elected for the final time in May 1981, Olejniczak resigned the following year on June 1, 1982. After serving over 24 years as Packers president, more than anyone in the team's history, he was succeeded by judge Robert J. Parins. During his tenure, the Packers' net worth grew over 5,000% and Lambeau Field grew in size from 32,000 sears to over 57,000 seats. At that time, Olejniczak was named the first Packer Chairman of the Board and served in that role until 1989. He was inducted into the Green Bay Packers Hall of Fame in 1979. Packers' team historian Cliff Christl noted that Olejniczak "was a soft-spoken consensus-builder, but carried considerable clout while serving as president of the Packers".

Personal life
On November 24, 1938, Olejniczak married Regina Bettine at St. Francis Xavier Cathedral in Green Bay. The couple adopted two sons, Thomas Marshall Olejniczak and Mark Dominic Olejniczak. Olejniczak was a Roman Catholic and a member of the Knights of Columbus. He received the Knighthood of St. Gregory and an honorary doctorate of law degree from St. Norbert College in De Pere in 1986. He was also the first lay President of Premontre High School (later Notre Dame de la Baie Academy). Olejniczak died at age 80 at his home in Green Bay after numerous strokes. His funeral at St. Mary's of the Angels parish was filled to capacity, and he is buried at Allouez Catholic Cemetery in Green Bay.

References

External links

1908 births
1989 deaths
Catholics from Wisconsin
Green Bay Packers presidents
National Football League team presidents
Mayors of Green Bay, Wisconsin
Wisconsin city council members
20th-century American politicians
Green Bay East High School alumni